Cyrtodactylus caovansungi is a species of gecko, a lizard in the family Gekkonidae. The species is endemic to Vietnam.

Etymology
The specific name, caovansungi, is in honor of Vietnamese biologist Cao Van Sung.

Geographic range
C. caovansungi is found in southern Vietnam, in Ninh Thuan Province

Habitat

Description

Reproduction
C. caovansungi is oviparous.

References

Further reading
Orlov N, Nguyen TQ, Nazarov RA, Ananjeva NB, Nguyen NS (2007). "A New Species of the Genus Cyrtodactylus Gray, 1827 and Redescription of Cyrtodactylus paradoxus (Darevsky et Szczerbak, 1997) [Squamata: Sauria: Gekkonidae] from South Vietnam". Russian Journal of Herpetology 14 (2): 145–152. (Cyrtodactylus caovansungi, new species).

Cyrtodactylus
Reptiles of Vietnam
Reptiles described in 2007